Giswil is a Swiss railway station on the Brünig line, owned by the Zentralbahn, that links Lucerne and Interlaken. The station is in the municipality of Giswil in the canton of Obwalden.

The line from Giswil over the Brünig Pass towards Interlaken is equipped with rack rails, and Giswil is the furthest station from Lucerne that can be served by trains not fitted with rack equipment.

Services 
The following services stop at Giswil:

 Lucerne S-Bahn : half-hourly service to Lucerne.

Gallery

References

External links 
 

Railway stations in the canton of Obwalden
Zentralbahn stations